Syntactic gemination, or syntactic doubling, is an external sandhi phenomenon in Italian, other Romance languages spoken in Italy, and Finnish. It consists in the lengthening (gemination) of the initial consonant in certain contexts. It may also be called word-initial gemination or phonosyntactic consonantal gemination.

In Italian it is called raddoppiamento sintattico (RS), raddoppiamento fonosintattico (RF), raddoppiamento iniziale, or rafforzamento iniziale (della consonante).

Italian

"Syntactic" means that gemination spans word boundaries, as opposed to word-internal geminate consonants as in  "cat" or  "year". In Standard Italian, syntactic doubling occurs after the following words (with exceptions described below):
all stressed ("strong") monosyllables (monosillabi forti) and some unstressed ("weak") monosyllables (monosillabi deboli): a, blu, che, ché, chi, ciò, da, dà, dì, do, e, è, fa, fra, fu, già, giù, ha, ho, la (noun), là, lì, ma, me (stressed), mi (noun), né, o (conjunction), più, può, qua, qui, re, sa, se (conjunction), sé, si (noun), sì, so, sta, sto, su, sù, te (stressed), tè, tra, tre, tu, va, etc
Example: Andiamo a casa , 'Let's go home'
all polysyllables stressed on the final vowel (oxytones)
Example: Parigi è una città bellissima , 'Paris is a very beautiful city'
a few paroxytones (words with stress on the second-last syllable) when they are not substantivized: come, dove (ove), qualche, sopra (sovra)
Example: Come va? , 'How are you?' 
Articles, clitic pronouns (mi, ti, lo, etc.) and various particles do not cause doubling in Standard Italian. Phonetic results such as occasional  →  'the dog' in colloquial (typically Tuscan) speech are transparent cases of synchronic assimilation.
 
The cases of doubling are commonly classified as "stress-induced doubling" and "lexical".

Lexical syntactic doubling has been explained as a diachronic development, initiating as straightforward synchronic assimilation of word-final consonants to the initial consonant of the following word, subsequently reinterpreted as gemination prompts after terminal consonants were lost in the evolution from Latin to Italian (ad > a, et > e, etc.).

Stress-induced word-initial gemination conforms to phonetic structure of Italian syllables: stressed vowels in Italian are phonetically long in open syllables, short in syllables closed by a consonant; final stressed vowels are by nature short in Italian, thus attract lengthening of a following consonant to close the syllable. In città di mare 'seaside city', the stressed short final vowel of città thus produces .

Regional occurrence
Syntactic gemination is used in Standard Italian and it is also the normal native pronunciation in Tuscany, Central Italy (both stress-induced and lexical) and Southern Italy (only lexical), including Sicily and Corsica. In Northern Italy, speakers use it inconsistently because the feature is not present in the dialectal substratum, and it is not usually shown in the written language unless a single word is produced by the fusion of two constituent words: "chi sa"-> chissà ('who knows' in the sense of 'goodness knows'). It is not unusual to hear northern speakers pronounce geminates when present in established written forms, but not observe syntactic gemination if not written in an otherwise identical phonological sequence. Thus "chissà chi è stato" with [ss], meaning "who knows (I wonder) who did it" may contrast with "chi sa chi è stato?" with [s], meaning "who (of you) knows who did it?", whereas speakers from areas where chi is acquired naturally as a gemination trigger will have phonetic [ss] for both.

It is not normally taught in the grammar programmes of Italian schools so most speakers are not consciously aware of its existence. Those northern speakers who do not acquire it naturally often do not try to adopt the feature.

Exceptions
It does not occur in the following cases:
A pause is at the boundary of words in question. In particular, initial gemination may be conditioned by syntax, which determines the likelihood of pause. For example, in the phrase La volpe ne aveva mangiato metà prima di addormentarsi ('The fox had eaten half of it before falling asleep'), there is no gemination after metà if there is even a slight pause, as prima is part of the adjunct, a sentence element that is easily isolated phonologically from the main clause within the prosodic hierarchy of the phrase.
The stressed final vowel is lengthened.
A sharp break or change occurs in the pitch on the word boundary.
There are other considerations, especially in various dialects, so that initial gemination is subject to complicated lexical, syntactic and phonological/prosodic conditions.

Finnish
In Finnish, the phenomenon is called rajageminaatio or rajakahdennus, alku- or loppukahdennus (boundary gemination, boundary lengthening).

It is triggered by certain morphemes. If the morpheme boundary is followed by a consonant, then it is doubled; if by a vowel then a long glottal stop is introduced. For example, "mene pois" is pronounced "meneppois"  and "mene ulos" . Following Fred Karlsson (who called the phenomenon "initial doubling"), these triggering morphemes are called x-morphemes and marked with a superscript 'x', e.g., "sadex".

Some of the southeastern dialects lack this feature. For example, tule tänne ("come here") may sound more like "tuletänne" instead of the standard pronunciation "tulettänne".

See also
Aspirated h
Consonant mutation
Sandhi
Liaison (French)

Notes

References

Syntactic Doubling
Robert A. Hall, Jr. "Initial Consonants and Syntactic Doubling in West Romance", Language, Vol. 40, No. 4 (1964), pp. 551–556.
Loporcaro Michele, "L’origine del raddoppiamento fonosintattico: saggio di fonologia diacronica romanza", Francke Verlag, Basel, 1997.
Absalom, Matthew, and Hajek, John (2006), "Raddoppiamento sintattico and Prosodic Phonology: A Re-evaluation" (also PDF), In Allan, Keith, Eds. Proceedings 2005 Conference of the Australian Linguistics Society, Monash University.

Finnish language
Italian language
Phonetics
Reduplication